Hyori's Homestay is a South Korean television program starring celebrity couple Lee Hyori and Lee Sang-soon. It aired on JTBC on Sundays at 20:50 (KST); the first episode aired on June 25, 2017. The show is set at the residence of Hyo-ri and Lee Sang-soon in Jeju Island, where they opened a B&B.

Cast

Main
 Lee Hyori
 Lee Sang-soon

Employees

Season 1
 IU

Season 2
 Im Yoon-ah
 Park Bo-gum (Part-time)

Guests

Ratings

Season 1

Season 2

Awards and nominations

References

External links
 
 

South Korean reality television series
Television shows set in Jeju Province
Korean-language television shows
2017 South Korean television series debuts
JTBC original programming
Television series by SM C&C
2018 South Korean television series endings